Haddon is a masculine given name which may refer to:

Haddon Donald (born 1917), New Zealand former soldier, businessman and politician
Haddon King (1905-1990), Australian geologist
Haddon Mason (1898-1966), British film actor
Haddon Robinson (1931-2017), American evangelical preacher and professor
Haddon Storey (born 1930), Australian former politician
Haddon Sundblom (1899-1976), American artist 

English-language masculine given names